Bertrand Landrieu (9 February 1945 – 7 December 2019) was a French politician and prefect.

Biography
Landrieu was the son of a doctor. After obtaining a master's degree in public law, he attended Sciences Po, and then the École Nationale d'Administration. He first got a job as an administrator at the French Ministry of the Interior.

Landrieu spent most of his career as a prefect, after spending the early part of his career as a cabinet minister.

In 1971, he became prefect of Sarthe, and in 1973 joined the Ministry of Agriculture. From 1974 to 1977, Landrieu served as subprefect of Ussel.

A close friend of Jacques Chirac, Landrieu served as Chirac's chief of staff from 1995 to 2002. Simultaneously, he was President of the National Forests Office. Then, in July 2002, he was appointed prefect of Île-de-France and Paris. In this time, he was also President of Île-de-France Mobilités.

After Landrieu retired from his life as a prefect, he served on Chirac's staff until March 2012, when he retired from public life.

Landrieu helped with François Fillon's campaign in Paris's 2nd constituency.

Bertrand Landrieu died on 7 December 2019.

References

1945 births
2019 deaths
Politicians from Paris
Prefects of Sarthe
Prefects of Haute-Vienne
Prefects of Manche
20th-century French politicians